The International Tennis Federation (ITF) is the governing body of world tennis, wheelchair tennis, and beach tennis. It was founded in 1913 as the International Lawn Tennis Federation by twelve national tennis associations. As of 2016, there are 211 national and six regional associations that make up the ITF's membership.

The ITF's governance responsibilities include maintaining and enforcing the rules of tennis, regulating international team competitions, promoting the game, and preserving the sport's integrity via anti-doping and anti-corruption programs. The ITF partners with the Women's Tennis Association (WTA) and the Association of Tennis Professionals (ATP) to govern professional tennis.

The ITF organizes the Grand Slam events, annual team competitions for men (Davis Cup), women (Billie Jean King Cup), and mixed teams (Hopman Cup), as well as tennis and wheelchair tennis events at the Summer Olympic and Paralympic Games on behalf of the International Olympic Committee. The ITF sanctions the Grand Slam tennis tournaments as well as circuits that span age ranges (junior, professional men and women, and seniors) as well as disciplines (wheelchair tennis; beach tennis). In addition to these circuits, the ITF also maintains rankings for juniors, seniors, wheelchair and beach tennis.

History 
Duane Williams, an American who lived in Switzerland, is generally recognized as the initiator and driving force behind the foundation of the International Tennis Federation. Originally called the International Lawn Tennis Federation (ILTF) it held its inaugural conference at the headquarters of the Union des Sociétés Françaises de Sports Athlétiques (USFSA), in Paris, France on 1 March 1913 which was attended by 12 national associations. Three other countries could not attend but had requested to become a member. Voting rights were divided based on the perceived importance of the individual countries, with Great Britain's Lawn Tennis Association (LTA) receiving the maximum six votes.

The LTA was given the perpetual right to organize the World Grass Championships, which led to a refusal by the United States Lawn Tennis Association (USLTA) to join the ILTF as they were of the opinion that this title should be given to the Davis Cup. France received permission to stage the World Hard Court Championships until 1916 and additionally a World Covered Court Championships was founded. The USLTA joined in 1923 on the basis of two compromises: the title 'World Championships' would be abolished, and wording would be 'for ever in the English language'. The World Championships were replaced by a new category of Official Championships for the main tournaments in Australia, France, England, and the United States; now known as the four Majors or Grand Slam events. In 1924, the ILTF became the officially recognised organisation with authority to control lawn tennis throughout the world, with official ILTF Rules of Tennis.

In 1939 the ILTF had 59 member nations. Its funds were moved to London, England during World War II and from that time onward the ITF has been run from there. It was based at Wimbledon until 1987, when it moved to Barons Court, next door to Queen's Club. It then moved again in 1998 to the Bank of England Sports Ground, Roehampton, its current base of operations. In 1977 the word 'Lawn' was dropped from the name of the organization, in recognition of the fact that most tennis events were no longer played on grass.

In reaction to the 2022 Russian invasion of Ukraine, the ITF cancelled all events in Russia. The ITF also excluded Russia from international team events, which include the Davis Cup, the Billie Jean King Cup, and the ATP Cup, and suspended the Russian Tennis Federation. However, the ATP and the WTA refused to yield to international pressure to ban individual players from competition, in a decision that reflects their loyalty to Vladimir Putin and their support of his invasion of Ukraine. Russian players will carry on, but not play under the Russian national flag.

Publications
Its official annual is The ITF Year, describing the activities of the ITF over the last 12 months. This replaced World of Tennis, which was the ITF official annual from 1981 through 2001. In addition, it publishes an official magazine three times a year.

Structure

National and regional associations 
As of 2017, there are 211 national associations affiliated with the ITF, of which 148 are voting members and 63 are associate members. The criteria for allocating votes (1, 3, 5, 7, 9, or 12) to each voting member are: performance in ITF team competitions; professional (ATP/WTA), junior, and wheelchair rankings of individuals; track record in organizing international tournaments; and contribution to ITF infrastructure. For example, France garners 12 votes, Canada has 9, Egypt has 5, Pakistan has 3, and Botswana has 1 vote.

Regional associations were created in July 1975 as six "supra-national associations" (Europe, Asia, Africa, North America, South America, and Australia) with the aim to decrease the gap between the ILTF and the national associations. These evolved into the current regional associations:
 Asian Tennis Federation (ATF) – 44 members
 Central American & Caribbean Tennis Confederation (COTECC) – 33 members
 Confederation of African Tennis (CAT) – 52 members
 Oceania Tennis Federation (OTF) – 20 members
 South America Tennis Confederation (COSAT) – 10 members
 Tennis Europe (TE) – 50 members
 ITF members with no regional affiliation (Canada and the United States)

Board of Directors 
The ITF President and Board of Directors are elected every four years by the national associations. Candidates are nominated by the national associations, and may serve up to twelve years.

List of presidents
The following people have served as president of the ITF:

Governance 
The ITF is the world governing body for the sport of tennis. Its governance includes the following responsibilities: make, amend, and enforce the Rules of Tennis; regulate international team competitions; promote the game of tennis; and preserve the integrity of tennis.

By its own constitution, the ITF guarantees that the official Rules of Tennis "shall be for ever in the English language". A committee within the ITF periodically makes rule amendment recommendations to the board of directors. The Rules of Tennis encompass the manner of play and scoring, in-game coaching, and the technical specifications of equipment (e.g. ball, racket, net, court) and other technology (e.g. player analysis technology). The Rules cover tennis, wheelchair tennis, and beach tennis.

Through the Tennis Anti-Doping Program, the ITF implements the World Anti-Doping Code (from the World Anti-Doping Agency, or WADA) for tennis. National associations must implement the code within its national jurisdiction, report violations up to the ITF and WADA, and report annually about all testing conducted. The Tennis Anti-Doping Program began in 1993, and applies to all players who play in ITF-sanctioned competitions, as well as tournaments on the ATP Tour and WTA Tour. In 2015, 2514 samples were collected from men and 1919 samples were collected from women; 2256 samples were collected during tennis tournaments ("in-competition") and 2177 were collected at other times ("out-of-competition").

The Tennis Integrity Unit (TIU) is a joint initiative of the primary governing bodies in tennis: the ITF, the Association of Tennis Professionals (ATP), the Women's Tennis Association (WTA), and the Grand Slam Board. Formed in 2008 in response to betting-related corruption challenges, the TIU's mandate is to protect tennis from "all forms of betting-related corrupt practices". As with the anti-doping efforts, national associations are charged with the responsibility of enforcing a code of conduct and reporting any violations.

Competitions

Team competitions

The ITF operates the two major annual international team competitions in the sport, the Davis Cup for men and the Billie Jean King Cup for women. It also sanctions the Hopman Cup, an annual mixed-gender team tournament. The ITF also organizes tennis and wheelchair tennis events every four years at the Summer Olympic and Paralympic Games on behalf of the International Olympic Committee.

Davis Cup

The Davis Cup, named after its founder Dwight F. Davis, is an annual team event organized by the ITF (since 1979 when it replaced the Committee of Davis Cup Nations as event organiser)  in men's tennis contested between teams from competing countries in a knock-out format. The first Davis Cup took place in 1900, prior to the formation of the ITF. Since 2019, the tournament has ended with the Davis Cup Finals, an 18-team event (being reduced to 16 effective in 2022) held at a single site in which teams are divided into groups for round-robin pool play. Eight teams advance to the quarterfinals, with all subsequent ties held in a standard knockout format. From 1981 to 2018, the tournament was divided into a 16-nation World Group, and zone groups (Americas; Europe/Africa; and Asia/Oceania) which compete in three or four tiers. Starting in 2019, the Davis Cup introduced a new format for its top level. The World Group was expanded to two levels, World Group I and World Group II, each consisting of 24 teams (reducing to 16 from 2022), with lower levels remaining intact. Each year, successful teams are may be promoted up one level, while unsuccessful teams are relegated down one level. Davis Cup rounds are contested four times per year, scheduled to minimize disruption with the ATP Tour to encourage participation. In each round, a combination of singles and doubles matches are contested to determine the winners. In 2020, 142 nations participated, making it the largest annual international team competition in sport.

Billie Jean King Cup

The Billie Jean King Cup is an annual team event organized by the ITF in women's tennis, similar in format to the Davis Cup. It was launched in 1963 as the Federation Cup to celebrate the 50th anniversary of the ITF, renamed the Fed Cup in 1995, and renamed again to honor tennis great Billie Jean King in 2020. The current format, adopted in 2020, is similar to that now used for the Davis Cup, with nations being divided into zone groups (Americas; Europe/Africa; and Asia/Oceania) which compete in two or three tiers, with the top tier being the 12-team Billie Jean King Cup Finals. The Finals are conducted in a similar manner as those of the Davis Cup, with pool play followed by knockout semifinals and finals. The winner and runner-up of the Finals automatically qualify for the next season's Finals. Teams ranked 3–10 advance to the next season's Billie Jean King Cup Qualifiers, where they play against the winners of the previous season's Billie Jean King Cup Play-offs. The play-offs in turn involve the losing teams from the Qualifiers and winning teams from the top-level zone groups. Like the Davis Cup, the rules of promotion and relegation are almost the same each year. Billie Jean King Cup rounds are contested three times per year, scheduled to minimize disruption with the WTA Tour to encourage participation. In each round, a combination of singles and doubles matches are contested to determine the winners. In 2020, 116 nations participated, making it the largest annual international team competition in women's sport.

Hopman Cup

The Hopman Cup is an annual team event which is contested by mixed-gender national teams. The first tournament was held in 1989, and the event has been sanctioned by the ITF since 1997. The tournament is held over one week at the start of the tennis season (late December or early January) in Australia. Each year, eight nations are selected to compete, with one female and one male invited to attend. Two pools of four teams each play matches in a round-robin format, with the top team from each pool qualifying for the final.

Olympics and Paralympics

Tennis (lawn tennis) was part of the Summer Olympic Games program from the inaugural 1896 Summer Olympics, but was dropped after the 1924 Summer Olympics due to disputes between the ITF and the International Olympic Committee over allowing amateur players to compete. After two appearances as a demonstration sport in 1968 and 1984, it returned as a full medal sport at the 1988 Summer Olympics and has been played at every edition of the Games since then.

Wheelchair tennis was first contested at the Summer Paralympic Games as a demonstration sport in 1988, with two events being held (Men's and Women's Singles). It became an official medal-awarding sport in 1992 and has been competed at every Summer Paralympics since then. Four events were held from 1992 to 2000, with quad events (mixed gender) in both singles and doubles added in 2004.

Individual competitions

The ITF sanctions the Grand Slam tennis tournaments as well as circuits which span age ranges (junior, professional, and seniors) as well as disciplines (wheelchair tennis; beach tennis). In addition to these circuits, the ITF also maintains rankings for juniors, seniors, wheelchair, and beach tennis.

Grand Slam tournaments

The ITF organizes and sanctions the 'Official Tennis Championships of the International Tennis Federation', commonly known as the Grand Slam events: the Australian Open, the French Open, Wimbledon, and the US Open. It is a member of the Grand Slam Committee.

Professional circuit

The ITF organizes introductory ("apprentice" level) professional circuits for both men and women as a bridge between junior tournaments and playing on the higher-profile tours organized by the ATP and WTA, respectively. Professional circuit tournaments are open to all tennis players aged 14 and over based on merit, and offer both prize money and world ranking points for main draw match victories. The tournaments are owned or sanctioned by the national associations and approved by the ITF.

Although circuits were introduced to men's tennis in 1976, the ITF assumed responsibility for developing them in 1990. From then until 2006, four-week satellite tournaments were run, where participants were required to compete in the entire series. In 1998, single-week ITF Futures tournaments were introduced, although they are scheduled in two or three-week geographic clusters. As of 2016, over 600 ITF Futures tournaments in 77 countries were held, with prize funds ranging from US$10,000 to US$25,000. ITF Futures tournaments represent the third tier of men's tournaments, below the mid-level ATP Challenger Tour and the top-level ATP World Tour.

The ITF assumed responsibility for an apprentice-level women's circuit in 1984. As of 2016, the ITF Women's Circuit includes over 500 tournaments in 65 countries, with prize funds ranging from US$10,000 to US$100,000. The ITF Women's Circuit is the third tier in women's tennis, below the mid-level WTA 125 tournaments and the top-level WTA Tour.

Junior circuit

Starting in 1977, the ITF has organized a series of international tennis tournaments for junior players. Tournaments have various grades: Grade A (the highest; junior Grand Slams and some others), Grade 1, Grade 2, Grade 3, Grade 4, and Grade 5 (the lowest). Depending on the grade of tournament, players earn points toward the ITF Junior World Rankings. In 2004, the ITF introduced combined junior rankings rather than maintaining separate singles and doubles rankings for juniors in an effort to encourage doubles play. As of 2015, the junior circuit includes 400 tournaments in 121 countries, open to players who are between their 13th and 19th birthdays.

In order to help high-ranking junior girls transition from the junior circuit to the professional circuit, the ITF began the Girls Junior Exempt Project in 1997. Under this program, girls ranked in the top 10 at the end of the year are given direct entry into the main draw of three events on the ITF professional circuit the following year. In 2006, this project was extended for boys under similar rules.

Seniors circuit

The ITF World Tennis Masters Tour was renamed in August 2022 (previously ITF Seniors Tour). The ITF World Tennis Masters Tour provides a range of team and individual singles, doubles and mixed doubles events for each five-year age increment from 30+ to 90+.
The ITF World Tennis Masters Tour Circuit has over 380 tournaments in more than 72 countries. There are six (6) tournament grades. The entry level tournament grade is MT100, followed by MT200, MT400, MT700, MT1000 and World Championships. MT700, MT1000 and World Championships are amongst the elite tournaments on the World Tour attracting some of the very best tennis players globally including but not limited to former ATP players.

Previously, tournaments were classified into various grades, with Grade A being the highest and Grade 5 being the lowest. Rankings were maintained in a series of age groups where the starting ages advance five years at a time (e.g. 35 years and older; 40 years and older) up to the 85 years and older group. World championships began in 1981. In 1993, the world championships were divided into two age ranges, and in 2015 it was further divided into three age ranges. As of 2015, the ranges are Young Seniors (35 to 49); Seniors (50 to 64); and Super-Seniors (65 to 85).

Wheelchair circuit

The first circuit for wheelchair tennis, formed in 1980 by the National Foundation of Wheelchair Tennis, had ten tournaments. Beginning in 1992, the Wheelchair Tennis Tour began with eleven events, organized by the International Wheelchair Tennis Federation (IWTF) which merged with the ITF six years later. As of 2016, the wheelchair tennis circuit includes over 160 events in over 40 countries. This includes tournaments ranging from Futures (the lowest level) up to the Grand Slams.

Beach tennis circuit

In 2008, the ITF assumed responsibility for the development of beach tennis and launched the Beach Tennis Tour (BTT). This tour started with 14 tournaments, but has grown to nearly 300 tournaments by 2015. The most prestigious of these are the ITF Beach Tennis World Team Championship, ITF Beach Tennis World Championships, European Beach Tennis Championships, and the ITF Pan American Championships. Like the other ITF circuits, tournaments are sanctioned by the ITF and primarily organized by national associations. The ITF also maintains a system of rankings for beach tennis players.

Awards and rankings

World champions 
The ITF designates a World Champion in several disciplines each year based on performances throughout the year, emphasizing the Grand Slam tournaments, and also considering team events such as the Davis Cup and Fed Cup. Singles champions were first named in 1978, and are chosen by an ITF panel. In later years, World Champion awards were added for doubles, juniors (using a combined singles and doubles ranking), and wheelchair players.

Although the panel selections generally agree with the year-end ATP and WTA rankings, this is not always the case. For example, Jennifer Capriati was designated as the World Champion in 2001, after winning the Australian Open and French Open and finishing the year ranked number two. Lindsay Davenport, on the other hand, finished the year ranked number one, but her best performances at majors were two semifinal appearances.

Philippe Chatrier Award 

The Philippe Chatrier Award is an annual ITF award to recognise individuals or organisations who have made outstanding contributions to tennis globally, both on and off the court. The award, introduced in 1996, is considered to be the ITF's highest accolade and is named after the former French tennis player Philippe Chatrier, who was President of the governing body between 1977 and 1991.

National rankings 

The ITF maintains rankings of nations in both women's and men's tennis based solely on recent performances in the Billie Jean King Cup and Davis Cup, respectively. These rankings are used to seed teams at the start of each year in their respective groups.

The women's and men's rankings are calculated using a similar method. In both cases, a nation's points are a weighted sum of points earned over the past four years. Points are earned by victorious nations depending on the group (e.g. World Group versus Zonal Groups), the round (e.g. final versus first round), and the ranking of the opponent being played. For the men's ranking only, additional bonus points are awarded for winning on an opponent's home ground. Points earned in the last 12 months are weighted at 100%, but points earned two years (75%), three years (50%), and four years (25%) ago are weighted less.

Player rating and registration

ITN
The International Tennis Number (ITN)
is an international tennis rating system that gives tennis players a number that represents their general level of play. Players are rated from ITN 1 (ATP or WTA standard or equivalent) to 10 (starter players).

Conversion charts have been developed linking the ITN to other existing rating systems in ITF tennis nations and in time it is hoped that every tennis player worldwide will have a rating.

Below ITN 10 there are 3 further categories linked to the slower balls:
10.1 for players using green balls on the full-size court
10.2 for players using orange balls on the 18 metre court
10.3 for players using red balls on the 11 metre court

Once players can ‘serve, rally and score’ they should have a rating to help them find players of a similar level to play with.

IPIN
In late 2004 the ITF initiated a new IPIN (International Player Identification Number) programme that requires all players who play in ITF Pro Circuit tournaments to register online. The use of IPIN has since been extended to include the ITF Junior, Seniors, and Wheelchair Circuits. A player's IPIN, which is 3 letters followed by 7 numbers, is assigned upon registration and will not change during the course of his or her career. Once registered, players can use the IPIN website to enter and withdraw from ITF tournaments, access tournament information and updates, and see details relating to any code of conduct offenses. Annual IPIN registration fees vary depending on the ITF circuit chosen by the player.

Integrity 
The ITF administers the Tennis Anti-Doping Programme (TADP) on behalf of the sport and as a WADA signatory. It also administered the Tennis Anti-Corruption Program (TACP) until 2020 via its operationally independent integrity division called the Tennis Integrity Unit (TIU). In 2021, the TIU was transferred out of the ITF into the new International Tennis Integrity Agency (ITIA) following a comprehensive review of corruption in the sport. From 2022, it is intended that the TADP will also be transferred over to the ITIA.

Fine of the Tunisian Tennis Federation
Tunisian player Malek Jaziri and Israeli player Amir Weintraub were scheduled to play each other at the 2013 Tashkent Challenger in October 2013, however Jaziri withdrew from the competition. According to Jaziri's brother, Jaziri had been ordered to withdraw from the competition.

The Association of Tennis Professionals investigated and found that Jaziri had done nothing wrong and that the Tunisian Tennis Federation's interference with the game had constituted a breach of the ITF Constitution. Consequently, Tunisia was suspended from the 2014 Davis Cup competition. ITF president Francesco Ricci Bitti said, "There is no room for prejudice of any kind in sport or in society. The ITF Board decided to send a strong message to the Tunisian Tennis Federation that this kind of action will not be tolerated."

Fine of the Israel Tennis Association
A Davis Cup game between the Israeli national tennis team and the Belgian national tennis team was scheduled in Antwerp for 14 September 2013. Because the match was scheduled for Yom Kippur, the Israeli team requested to postpone the match by one day. The Belgian national tennis team declined to postpone the game.

The International Tennis Federation intervened and postponed the match by one day. It also fined the Israel Tennis Association more than $13,000 for the inconvenience of rescheduling.

See also
 List of international sport federations
 Association of Tennis Professionals
 Women's Tennis Association
 History of tennis
 Grand Prix tennis circuit
 Tennis Integrity Unit
 International Tennis Integrity Agency
 Wightman Cup
 ITF Wheelchair Tennis Tour

Notes

References

Sources

External links
 
 Tennis Play and Stay site

 
IOC-recognised international federations
Roehampton
Sport in the London Borough of Wandsworth
Sports organizations established in 1913
Tennis governing bodies
1913 establishments in France